Ronda peridotite is a  peridotite body in Betic Cordillera, southern Spain.

See also
List of ophiolites: Mediterranean and Peri-Arabic ophiolites

References

External links
 Research project at University of South California

Geology of Spain
Ophiolites